Quel may refer to:

 QUEL query languages, a relational database access language
 Quel, La Rioja, a municipality in La Rioja, Spain
 Quél, taxonomic author abbreviation for Lucien Quélet (1832–1899), French naturalist and mycologist